Frederick of Montbéliard or Frederick of Mömpelgard (died 29 June 1091) was from a noble family in Lotharingia. Through marriage he became margrave of Turin (1080–1091).

Life
Frederick was a younger son of Count Louis of Montbéliard (died 1071) and Sophie, Countess of Bar. He is documented in Italy from 1071 onwards as a witness to the charters of Beatrice of Bar and her daughter Matilda of Tuscany, to whom he was related via his mother.

In 1080 Frederick married Agnes of Savoy, daughter of Peter I, Count of Savoy. Agnes was her father’s heir and after marrying Agnes, Frederick was invested with the title of margrave of Turin. He ruled only nominally, as real power remained in the hands of Agnes’ grandmother, Adelaide of Susa.
Frederick was presumably expected to succeed Adelaide, but he died before her in June 1091.

Marriage and children
With his wife, Agnes of Savoy, Frederick had several children, including:
Peter
Bruno
Siegfried

References
C.W. Previté-Orton, The Early History of the House of Savoy (1000–1233) (Cambridge, 1912), accessible online at:  archive.org
S. Hellmann, Die Grafen von Savoyen und das Reich: bis zum Ende der staufischen Periode (Innsbruck, 1900), accessible online (but without page numbers) at: Genealogie Mittelalter
G. Poull, La Maison souveraine et ducale de Bar (1994)
E. Goez, Beatrix von Canossa und Tuszien. Eine Untersuchung zur Geschichte des 11. Jahrhunderts (Sigmaringen, 1995).

External links
 Medieval Lands Project: Bar
Friedrich, Graf von Mömpelgard (in German)

Notes

11th-century births
1091 deaths
House of Bar
People from Lorraine